Ballestrero is an Italian surname. Notable people with the surname include:

Anastasio Ballestrero (1913–1998), Italian cardinal
Enrique Ballestrero (1905–1969), Uruguayan footballer
Massimo Ballestrero (1901–?), Italian rower

See also
Balestrero

Italian-language surnames